Carbone Smolan Agency is an independent branding agency founded in 1976 in New York City.

History

In 1976 Ken Carbone opened the New York office of the Canadian graphic design firm Gottschalk+Ash International. In 1977 he met and became business partners with Leslie Smolan. Theirs was an expanded view of "graphic design" beyond its two-dimensional applications and embraced the range interdisciplinary communication practices including customer experience design, architectural graphics, branded environments, and packaging design.

Carbone and Smolan bought out their Canadian partners in 1980, and renamed the company Carbone Smolan Agency. Carbone is creative director; Smolan is director of creative strategy. Company has served many notable corporate and cultural brands including such organizations as Musée du Louvre, Christie's, Mandarin Oriental Hotel Group, Morgan Stanley, Boston Consulting Group, Tapestry Inc., Dale Carnegie, Credit Suisse, High Museum of Art, Museum of Modern Art and Chicago Symphony Orchestra.

In December 1985 Carbone Smolan Agency presented its credentials for the “Signalétique du Grand Louvre,” the visitor information and signage program to complement the Louvre's visitors' entrance and underground plaza being designed by I.M. Pei, creator of the Louvre Pyramid. The French government awarded the New York-based Carbone Smolan Agency the signage project October 3, 1986.  Introduced to the public 1989, Carbone Smolan's visitor information and signage program was predicated on the Arrondissements of Paris plan and remains in place today.

In their report on the selection of Ken Carbone and Leslie Smolan as AIGA Medalists in 2014, AIGA journalist Angela Richers noted, "In 1985 they won the commission—an honor for a relatively young studio. The project’s success and high visibility helped establish CSA as a studio of major importance in the larger design landscape. Since the Louvre commission, CSA has served many of the most significant cultural institutions in the United States (see references below).

Carbone Smolan Agency's Louvre way-finding system is also featured in "Graphic Design Since 1950" by Alliance Graphique Internationale, This visitor's information program was also recipient of the Communication Arts 1990 Award of Excellence and featured in Communication Arts magazine.

In the ensuring years, Carbone Smolan Agency has designed for numerous notable cultural institutions including AIGA, MoMA (New York), Jewish Museum (Manhattan), Natural History Museum of Los Angeles County, and Brooklyn Botanic Garden. CSA has 20 exhibits in the AIGA permanent archives.

Awards and recognition 

2014 American Institute of Graphic Artists (AIGA) Medalists, Ken Carbone and Leslie Smolan
2012 GDUSA's American Web Design Awards, Website design Niles Bolton Associates
2010 Chicago Poster Biennial,  Poster Finalist: Diego Rivera by Ken Carbone
2008 SEGD Design Awards Merit Award, W. L. Gore Capabilities Center
2008 AIGA 365: 29, American Institute of Graphic Artist
2005 ReBrand 100 Awards: Best of Show, Assurant

References

External links 
 Carbone Smolan Agency website
 Ken Carbone On The Future Of Design at Fast Company
 Advertising Guru Ken Carbone Reveals 'What Drives an Entrepreneur at Wilkes University

Graphic design
American graphic designers
Design writers
Branding companies of the United States
Companies based in New York City
Brand valuation